Becoming is a reality show produced by MTV. The concept of the show was to have a randomly picked fan of an artist reproduce a music video by the artist (based on submissions).

The show was also broadcast on Canadian TV station MuchMusic.

The show was parodied by Canadian punk-rock band Not by Choice in the video for "Now That You Are Leaving".

References

External links
 

MTV original programming
2000s American reality television series
English-language television shows